Bradley Sheppard (born 23 May 1991) is a former Australian rules footballer who played for the West Coast Eagles in the Australian Football League (AFL). He was selected seventh overall in the 2009 National Draft.

Early career

Sheppard was born Perth, Western Australia and attended Wesley College. He represented Western Australia at the National AFL U18 Championships in both 2008, when he was ineligible to be drafted, and again in 2009, his draft year. In 2009, he played 15 games at WAFL League level with the East Fremantle Football Club and was also awarded a position in the Under 18 All-Australian as a back pocket for his performance at the 2009 AFL U18 Championships. Sheppard was invited to and attended the annual AFL Draft Camp at the Australian Institute of Sport in Canberra in October 2009 and tested in the top 10 in the 20 m sprint (=10th, 2.96s) and 6x30m repeat sprints (24.69s) out of those that attended.

He has represented Western Australia in cricket at under-17 level and is related to the Australian cricketing Marsh family, with Geoff Marsh as an uncle and cousins Shaun and Mitchell Marsh.

AFL career

Sheppard made his debut for the West Coast Eagles against Hawthorn in round 7, 2010. He was on the end of a dangerous tackle from Hawthorn's Chance Bateman which saw him suspended for two weeks.

In 2015, he was named the club's player of the finals after an impressive campaign which saw the Eagles make the Grand Final, ultimately losing to a rampant Hawthorn. Sheppard was one of the best in the deciding match.

In Round 17 of the 2018 Season, Sheppard played his 150th match against the Fremantle Dockers.

In the first week of the 2018 Finals series, Sheppard suffered a season-ending hamstring injury and subsequently missed playing in the 2018 AFL Grand Final which was won by West Coast. Sheppard bounced back the next two seasons, making the All Australian squad in 2019, Sheppard made the final cut in 2020 being selected as a defender in the All-Australian team.

Sheppard suffered two major concussions in 2021, the first a serious head collision with Carlton’s Adam Saad in Round 12, the other in Round 22 against Fremantle suffering delayed concussion after landing head first on concrete after falling over a fence at Optus Stadium, Sheppard was force to miss games the following week from both incidents. In December of that year, Sheppard, still suffering ongoing symptoms from the two head knocks, was forced into retirement after receiving medical advice that if he would continued to play he would risk more damage to himself.

Playing style

Sheppard is a versatile medium-sized player that has primarily played as a defender, but has also demonstrated ability at playing midfield and half forward roles. He is considered a well-rounded young player with good ball carrying ability, neat and reliable foot skills, fine decision making ability, strong work-ethic and athleticism (speed and endurance) as strengths.

Statistics
 Statistics are correct to the end of the 2021 season

|- style="background:#eaeaea;"
! scope="row" | 
|  || 12 || 14 || 2 || 6 || 118 || 90 || 208 || 42 || 31 || 0.1 || 0.4 || 8.4 || 6.4 || 14.9 || 3.0 || 2.2 
|-
! scope="row" | 
|  || 12 || 6 || 1 || 0 || 48 || 26 || 74 || 17 || 22 || 0.2 || 0.0 || 8.0 || 4.3 || 12.3 || 2.8 || 3.7 
|- style="background:#eaeaea;"
! scope="row" | 
|  || 5 || 12 || 6 || 3 || 98 || 58 || 156 || 47 || 24 || 0.5 || 0.3 || 8.2 || 4.8 || 13.0 || 3.9 || 2.0 
|-
! scope="row" | 
|  || 5 || 13 || 3 || 4 || 97 || 57 || 154 || 37 || 31 || 0.2 || 0.3 || 7.5 || 4.4 || 11.9 || 2.6 || 2.4 
|- style="background:#eaeaea;"
! scope="row" | 
|  || 5 || 14 || 0 || 1 || 162 || 72 || 234 || 57 || 34 || 0.0 || 0.1 || 11.6 || 5.1 || 16.7 || 4.1 || 2.4 
|- 
! scope="row" | 
|  || 5 || 25 || 3 || 4 || 264 || 163 || 427 || 141 || 39 || 0.1 || 0.2 || 10.6 || 6.5 || 17.1 || 5.6 || 1.6 
|- style="background:#eaeaea;"
! scope="row" | 
|  || 5 || 23 || 1 || 2 || 207 || 167 || 374 || 110 || 48 || 0.0 || 0.1 || 9.0 || 7.3 || 16.3 || 4.8 || 2.1 
|- 
! scope="row" | 
|  || 5 || 24 || 1 || 0 || 188 || 169 || 357 || 99 || 71 || 0.0 || 0.0 || 7.8 || 7.0 || 14.9 || 4.1 || 3.0 
|- style="background:#eaeaea;"
! scope="row" | 
|  || 5 || 23 || 0 || 1 || 253 || 120 || 373 || 148 || 53 || 0.0 || 0.0 || 11.0 || 5.2 || 16.2 || 6.4 || 2.3 
|- 
! scope="row" | 
|  || 5 || 24 || 0 || 2 || 324 || 139 || 463 || bgcolor=CAE1FF | 188† || 37 || 0.0 || 0.1 || 13.5 || 5.8 || 19.3 || 7.8 || 1.5 
|- style="background-color: #EAEAEA"
! scope="row" style="text-align:center" | 2020
|  
|| 5 || 18 || 2 || 0 || 194 || 92 || 286 || 112 || 34 || 0.1 || 0.0 || 10.8 || 5.1 || 15.9 || 6.2 || 1.9 
|-
! scope="row" | 
|  || 5 || 20 || 0 || 0 || 220 || 127 || 347 || 129 || 32 || 0.0 || 0.0 || 11.0 || 6.4 || 17.4 || 6.5 || 1.6 
|- style="background:#eaeaea;"
|- class="sortbottom"
! colspan=3| Career
! 216
! 19
! 23
! 2173
! 2544
! 3453
! 1127
! 456
! 0.1
! 0.1
! 10.1
! 5.9
! 16.0
! 5.2
! 2.1
|}

Notes

References

External links

Brad Sheppard profile - WAFL Online

1991 births
Living people
West Coast Eagles players
East Fremantle Football Club players
People educated at Wesley College, Perth
Australian rules footballers from Perth, Western Australia
All-Australians (AFL)